The Genesee and Water Street Railroad, a horse-drawn street trolley in Syracuse, New York, was established in 1865. The company was one of three different railways that were awarded operation franchise rights to run cars in James Street. The firm also secured the franchise to operate cars in Westcott Street, to South Beech Street, Euclid Avenue, College Place, University Place, Walnut Avenue and Madison Street.

The road merged with Syracuse Consolidated Street Railway in 1890, after an agreement was made that allowed the new company to lease the lines.

References

Defunct railroads in Syracuse, New York
Defunct New York (state) railroads
Railway companies established in 1865
Railway companies disestablished in 1890
Interurban railways in New York (state)